Mark Fredric Baker (October 2, 1946 – August 13, 2018) was an American actor. He was best known for the title role in Harold Prince's revival of Candide, for which he received a Tony Award nomination, and his portrayal of Otto Kringelein in the international tour of Grand Hotel.

Early life 
Mark Fredric Baker was born in Cumberland, Maryland on October 2, 1946, to parents Francis Tweedie and Aretta Sue Swayne. Baker attended Carnegie Mellon University and Wittenberg University. He trained for the stage at the Neighborhood Playhouse School of the Theatre in New York City.

Career 
Baker made his professional acting debut portraying Linus Van Pelt in You're a Good Man, Charlie Brown in a 1970 off-Broadway production. In November 1971, Baker appeared at the Mercer-O'Casey Theatre playing the Boy in Love Me, Love My Children. Baker made his Broadway theatre debut in November 1972 playing Cook in Via Galactica, a musical which, having lost nearly $1 million, is considered one of the worst flops in Broadway history. Baker appeared on Broadway again in 1974 in the title role of Candide, a performance which earned him a Theatre World Award and a nomination for the Tony Award for Best Featured Actor in a Musical.

From 1990 to 1991, Baker appeared as Otto Kringelein in the Broadway international tour of Grand Hotel at venues throughout the United States, Canada and Japan, and received a Helen Hayes Award for his performance at the Kennedy Center. Other venues at which Baker has performed include The Public Theater and what was then referred to as the Martin Beck Theatre.  More recently he appeared on a studio recording of George Gershwin's Tip-Toes in 2001.

In 1976, Baker appeared in the romantic adventure film Swashbuckler. The following year, he supplied the voice acting for Raggedy Andy in the animated film Raggedy Ann & Andy: A Musical Adventure. Baker served as assistant director to Ken Russell in the 1977 film Valentino. Baker also appeared in the 1982 film Smithereens, credited as Roger Jett.

Personal life and death 
Baker married actress and designer Patricia Britton, though the marriage ended in divorce.

Baker died on August 13, 2018 in Cumberland. He devoted the last twenty years of his life to restoring and operating that city's Embassy Theatre.

Filmography

Film

Television

References

External links

1946 births
2018 deaths
Male actors from Maryland
Carnegie Mellon University alumni
Wittenberg University alumni
Neighborhood Playhouse School of the Theatre alumni
Actors from Cumberland, Maryland
American male stage actors
American male film actors
20th-century American male actors